Johann Büssow (born 1973) is a historian of the modern Middle East. He is professor of Middle Eastern Studies at the Ruhr University Bochum.

Academic career
Johann Büssow studied political science, Islamic studies and Jewish studies. He has taught five years at Free University of Berlin, where he also obtained a PhD in Middle Eastern Studies in 2008. Later he has worked as a research associate at the German Orient-Institut in Beirut, Lebanon and at the Research Centre ‘Difference and Integration’ (SFB 586) at the University of Halle-Wittenberg, Germany. From 2013 to 2018 he had been professor of Islamic History and Culture at the University of Tübingen. 

Johann Büssow is section editor for the history of the Arab world from 1500 to the present of the Encyclopaedia of Islam Three (Brill, Leiden) and co-editor of the book series 'Studien zur Geschichte und Zeitgeschichte Westasiens und Nordafrikas' (LIT Verlag, Berlin u.a.).

Current projects
Johann Büssow's research focuses on the social and political history of the modern Middle East and intellectual history in the modern Islamic world since the eighteenth century.

Together with a team of historians around Yuval Ben-Bassat (Haifa) and Khaled Safi (Gaza) he is currently working on Gaza and its region during the late Ottoman period. With the historian Stefan Rohdewald (Gießen) he co-directs a research project on Palestine as a region of migration during the transition from late Ottoman to British Mandatory rule, in the framework of the research cluster "Transottomanica". With Astrid Meier (Beirut), he is preparing a book-length study with the tentative title "Bedouin Syria: The Arid Lands of the Middle East, 1516–2011". Together with several colleagues from Tübingen, he is conducting an interdisciplinary research project on the history of oasis towns in Oman.

Published books
 Büssow, Johann (2011). Hamidian Palestine: Politics and Society in the District of Jerusalem, 1872-1908. Leiden: Brill, .
 — (2012). Geschichtsort Jaffator: Osmanische Kommunalverwaltung und bürgerschaftliches Engagement in Jerusalem, 1867-1917. Berlin: Aphorisma, .
 — with Khaled Safi (2013). Damascus Affairs: Egyptian Rule in Syria through the Eyes of an Anonymous Damascene Chronicler, 1831-1840. Würzburg: Ergon, .

References

External links
 Department of Oriental and Islamic Studies
 Gaza during the late Ottoman period 
 Project ’Transottomanica’
 Bedouin Syria: The Arid Lands of the Middle East, 1516–2011
 History of oasis towns in Oman

Living people
1973 births
21st-century German historians
Historians of the Middle East
Academic staff of the University of Tübingen
Free University of Berlin alumni